Bernard II, Count of Laon (c. 845 – before 893) was a Frankish noble and a member of the Herbertien dynasty, a branch of the Carolingian dynasty. He was a descendant of Pepin of Italy and Charlemagne.

He was the first son of Pepin, first count of Vermandois, lord of Senlis, Péronne, and Saint Quentin. In 877/878 he was appointed Count of Laon by Charles the bald. sometime he was go to Parma in Italy, after his life is not known.

Bernard II's wife is unknown.

References

 Pocchetino, G. (1922). I Pipinidi in Italia (sec. VIII-XII), Archivio storico Lombardo, 54 (1927), str. 1-43.
 Violante, C. (1974). Quelques caractéristiques des structures familiales en Lombardie, Emilie et Toscane aux XI et XII siècles, Famille et parenté dans l'Occident medieval, str. 87-147.
 Christian Settipani, La Préhistoire des Capétiens (Nouvelle histoire généalogique de l'auguste maison de France, vol. 1), Villeneuve d'Ascq, éd. Patrick van Kerrebrouck, 1993, 545 p.
 Patrick Van Kerrebrouck, Nouvelle histoire généalogique de l'Auguste Maison de France, Bd. 1: La Préhistoire des Capétiens (von Christian Settipani), 1993

Notes

Herbertien dynasty
Place of birth unknown
Year of death unknown
Counts
Carolingian dynasty
Year of birth uncertain